Kerrie Keane is a Canadian actress.

She graduated from McMaster University with a Bachelor of Arts in history in 1970.

Her early film career included roles in The Incubus (1982), Spasms (1983), Morning Man (1986) and Bates Motel (1987). In 1987 she appeared in the film Obsessed and was nominated for the 1989 Genie Award for Best Performance by an Actress in a Leading Role. Keane also played the leading female role in the film Distant Thunder (1988) and appeared in the superhero film Steel (1997). She co-hosted What Will They Think of Next?, and appeared on episodes of such television series as Star Trek: The Next Generation, Matlock and Beverly Hills, 90210.

Filmography

Film

Television

Recognition
 1989 Genie Award for Best Performance by an Actress in a Leading Role - Obsessed - Nominated

References

External links
 

Canadian film actresses
Canadian television actresses
Place of birth missing (living people)
McMaster University alumni
Living people
Year of birth missing (living people)